Stalino may refer to:
Donetsk, Ukraine
Çaylı, Tartar, Azerbaijan - formerly Stalino